General Freire Airport is an airport serving Curicó, a city in the Maule Region of Chile. The airport is within the northeast part of the city.

Runway 01 has an  displaced threshold.

The  Curico VOR-DME (Ident: ICO) is located on the field.

See also

Transport in Chile
List of airports in Chile

References

External links
Curicó Airport at OpenStreetMap
Curicó Airport at OurAirports

General Freire Airport at FallingRain

Airports in Maule Region